Approaching Ali is an opera by composer D. J. Sparr and librettists Mark Campbell and Davis Miller. The inspiration for the opera comes from Miller's story "My Dinner With Ali" and his book The Tao of Muhammad Ali that related the friendship of the writer with the boxer Muhammad Ali.

Approaching Ali: A Chamber Opera in One Act had its world premiere at the Kennedy Center, Washington, D.C., on June 8, 2013, under the directorship of Nicole A. Watson. The opera was commissioned by Washington National Opera. In 2015, the opera was staged by North Carolina Opera.

Roles

Synopsis

The story is about a boy in North Carolina in the early 1960s who is galvanized to overcome some traumatic childhood events when he sees Muhammad Ali on television. More than twenty years later, as a writer on the brink of middle age, he now seeks to rekindle that spirit by visiting his boyhood hero in person at his mother's home in Louisville, Kentucky.

References

External links
Approaching Ali, djsparr.com

2013 operas
English-language operas
Operas
Operas set in the 20th century
Operas based on novels
Operas based on real people
Cultural depictions of Muhammad Ali